Events from the year 1644 in China.

Incumbents
 Ming dynasty – Chongzhen Emperor
 Qing dynasty – Shunzhi Emperor
 Co-regent: Dorgon 
 Co-regent: Jirgalang
 Shun dynasty – Li Zicheng

Events 
 Transition from Ming to Qing
 February and April 1644 - Battle of Beijing fought between forces of the Ming Dynasty and rebel forces led by Li Zicheng
 May 27 - Battle of Shanhai Pass

Births 
 Yang Jin (楊晉 ca. (1644-1728) was a Chinese painter

Deaths 
 Chongzhen Emperor, committed suicide